Melanempis is a genus of bees belonging to the family Apidae.

All of the species of this genus are endemic species of Madagascar. Melanempis atra was described by Saussure in 1890, the remains four species were discovered by Brooks & Pauly in 2001.

Species:

Melanempis atra 
Melanempis eremnochlora 
Melanempis fulva 
Melanempis scoliiformis 
Melanempis seyrigi

References

Apidae
Hymenoptera genera